Wildhorse Creek in Howard County, Texas is a tributary of Morgan Creek. It flows near Wildhorse Mountain.

References

Rivers of Howard County, Texas
Rivers of Texas